According to the Mahavamsa and Ramayana they lived among the Naga, Yakkha and Raskha. 
They ousted their arch enemies the Raskha from Sri Lanka, with the help of Lord Vishnu.
They were then subsequently conquered by King Ravana of the Raskha. After the Yakkhas had left to live in the mountains and remote dense forests, they met Gautama Buddha who converted them to Buddhism.

According to the Mahavansa, Gautama Buddha meet the Dewa at Mahiyangana. Buddha gave Sumana Saman (A leader of the Dewa) a few hairs from his head, which were placed in a golden urn and enshrined in a sapphire stupa. A buddhist monk called Sarabhu is then said to have deposited Buddha's ashes in this Stupa. This stupa is now called the "Mahiyangana Stupa" and can be found in Anuradhapura museum.

Sumana Saman was a leader of the Dewa who came from the central hills of Sri Lanka. Some Sri Lankan Buddhists worship him as deity. He is said to be the guardian of Adam's peak.

See also
 Sinhalese people
 Sri Lankan Tamil people
 Balangoda Man

References

 H. Parker (1909). Ancient Ceylon. New Delhi: Asian Educational Services. 7.
 H.R Perera. (1988). Buddhism in Sri Lanka - A short history. Available: http://www.buddhanet.net/pdf_file/bud-srilanka.pdf. Last accessed 02 10 10.

Ramayana
Buddhism in Sri Lanka